Elizabeth Polewheele (or Polewhele; later Lobb?; c. 1651 – c. 1691), playwright, was one of the first women to write for the professional stage in Restoration London.

Life and work
Little is known of Polewheele's life, though she has been tentatively identified as the daughter of nonconformist minister Theophilus Polwhele. That Elizabeth Polwhele was born in or around 1651, married another minister, Stephen Lobb, had five children, died in 1691, and is "probably" the playwright although the identification is "somewhat startling."

There are records of Polewheele's having written three plays: Elysium, "possibly a religious masque," now lost; The Faythfull Virgins, a tragedy in rhyme; and The Frolicks, a comedy. These latter plays exist only in manuscript. There is also "probably a eulogistic poem."

The Faythfull Virgins was likely performed at Lincoln's Inn Fields about 1670.

The Frolicks was possibly performed by the Duke's Company in 1671 at the new Dorset Garden Theatre; it features Clarabell, a witty Restoration heroine, and Rightwit, a rake. It was dedicated to Prince Rupert and signed "E. Polewheele". In the dedication she mentions performance of both her earlier plays, and continues, "I am young, no scholar, and what I write I write by nature, not by art."

Along with Aphra Behn and Frances Boothby, Polewheele was one of the first women to write for the professional stage in the early Restoration period.

Plays
Elysium (lost)
The Faythfull Virgins (ca. 1670; manuscript)
The Frolicks; or, The Lawyer Cheated (1671)

The Frolicks, or The Lawyer Cheated 
Written in or about 1671, the play existed solely in manuscript form until it was edited and published in a scholarly edition by Cornell University Press in 1977.

Manuscript

First production
On October 11–12, 2021, second year students of the Shakespeare and Performance program at Mary Baldwin University in Staunton, Virginia premiered the first full length production of The Frolicks. The show was produced by the program and directed by Sara Hymes and Gregory Jon Phelps, two members of the Hedgepig Ensemble located in Brooklyn, New York. Hedgepig worked closely with the production's publicity team as the play was selected for Hedgepig's 2021 "Expand the Canon" list.

Cast·
Andrew Steven Knight as Rightwit · 
Rosemary Richards as Clarabell · 
Kelsey Linberg as Leonora/Philario · 
Cole Metz as Mr. Zany · 
Chase D. Fowler as Sir Gregory · 
Kara Hankard as Plainman/Mistress · 
Gil Mitchel as Speak · 
Beth Somerville as Swallow · 
Kelsey Harrison as Mark · 
Madison Mayberry as Sir Makelove · 
George Durfee as Lord Courtall · 
Kailey Potter as Lady Meanwell · 
Cameron Taylor as Sir Meanwell · 
Sam Corey as Ralph · 
Madison Rudolph as Procreate/Drawer · 
Ariel Tatum as Faith/Turnkey/Constable

Notes

References
Brown, Susan, et al. "Elizabeth Polwhele." Orlando: Women’s Writing in the British Isles from the Beginnings to the Present. Ed. Susan Brown, Patricia Clements, and Isobel Grundy. Cambridge University Press. Cambridge UP, n.d. 22 Mar. 2013. Accessed 21 Sept. 2022.

Polewhele, Elizabeth. The Frolicks; or, The Lawyer Cheated. 1671. Eds. Judith Milhous and Robert D. Hume. Ithaca, [N.Y.]: Cornell University Press, 1977.  (Open access, Internet Archive)
Todd, Janet. "Elizabeth Polwhele." A Dictionary of British and American women writers, 1660-1800. Totowa, N.J.: Rowman & Allanheld, 1985, p. 259. (Open access, Internet Archive)
Wynne-Davies, Marion. "Polwhele, Elizabeth (?1651-1691) English Restoration dramatist." Dictionary of English Literature, Bloomsbury, 1997.

1650s births
1690s deaths
English dramatists and playwrights
British women dramatists and playwrights
17th-century English women writers
17th-century English writers